Villamarín may refer to:

Villamarín (Grado), Parish in Asturias, Spain
Estadio Benito Villamarín, football stadium in Spain used by Real Betis
Edgar Villamarín (born 1982), Peruvian footballer
José Villamarín (born 1950), Spanish handball player